Whoever You Are is a 1997 children's picture book by Mem Fox and illustrated by Leslie Staub. It was published by Harcourt, Inc. In this book, the narrator with four children goes around the world appreciating the differences and similarities in people.

Publication history
 Quienquiera Que Seas, 2001, USA, Libros Viajeros 
 1997, USA, Harcourt 
 1997, Australia, Hodder & Stoughton

Reception
A review in School Library Journal of Whoever You Are wrote that "Fox has composed a simple refrain to celebrate human connections in this lovely picture book. ... Staub's oil paintings complement the simple text". Kirkus Reviews called it "an essential book that acknowledges in the simplest of terms our common humanity".

Whoever You Are has also been reviewed by Booklist, Publishers Weekly, Horn Book Guides, and Criticas.

References

External links
 Library holdings of Whoever You Are

Australian picture books
1997 children's books
Picture books by Mem Fox
Children's books about race and ethnicity